China–Yemen relations refer to the bilateral relations of the People's Republic of China and Yemen. The two countries signed a treaty of friendship in 1958, with an agreement to cooperate in commercial, technical and cultural development. In the 1958 agreement, China issued Yemen an interest-free loan of 70 million Swiss francs with which Yemen could purchase supplies from China. At the same time, the city of Beijing provided an interest-free loan of $16.3 million to help fund development projects in Yemen. Another treaty of friendship was signed on June 9, 1964, along with additional agreements of cooperation in economic, technical and cultural development. China provided support in building factories and roads, and Beijing provided Yemen another interest-free loan, in the amount of $500,000.

Human rights
In June 2020, Yemen was one of 53 countries that backed the Hong Kong national security law at the United Nations.

See also 
 Foreign relations of the People's Republic of China
 Foreign relations of Yemen

References 

 
Yemen
Bilateral relations of Yemen